Richard Krajicek was the defending champion but not did compete that year.

Marc Rosset won in the final 6–3, 6–3 against David Prinosil.

Seeds

Draw

Finals

Top half

Bottom half

References

St. Petersburg Open
St. Petersburg Open
1999 in Russian tennis